Virginia's 97th House of Delegates district elects one of the 100 members of the Virginia House of Delegates, the lower house of the state's bicameral legislature. The district is made up of New Kent County and parts of Hanover County and King William County on the Middle Peninsula of Virginia.

The 97th district has been represented by Republican Scott Wyatt since 2020.

List of delegates

References

External links
 

Virginia House of Delegates districts
New Kent County, Virginia
Hanover County, Virginia
King William County, Virginia